Alois Karl (born 22 November 1950) is a German lawyer and politician from the Christian Social Union of Bavaria who served as a member of the German Bundestag from 2005 until 2021, representing Amberg. He also was Mayor of Neumarkt in der Oberpfalz from 1990 to 2005.

Political career 
Karl was a member of the Budget Committee and its Sub-Committee on European Affairs from 2005 until 2021; in 2014, he became the sub-committee's deputy chairman. On the Budget Committee, he served as his parliamentary group's rapporteur on the annual budget of the Federal Foreign Office. In addition, Karl served as chairman of the Parliamentary Friendship Group for Relations with the Baltic States and as member of the German delegation to the Parliamentary Assembly of the Organization for Security and Co-operation in Europe (OSCE).

In the negotiations to form a coalition government following the 2009 federal elections, Karl was part of the CDU/CSU delegation in the working group on transport and building policies; led by Hans-Peter Friedrich and Patrick Döring.

In July 2020, Karl announced that he would not stand in the 2021 federal elections but instead resign from active politics by the end of the parliamentary term.

Other activities 
 KfW, Member of the Board of Supervisory Directors

Political positions 
In June 2017, Karl voted against Germany's introduction of same-sex marriage.

References

External links

1950 births
Living people
People from Neumarkt in der Oberpfalz
Members of the Bundestag for Bavaria
Mayors of places in Bavaria
Members of the Bundestag 2017–2021
Members of the Bundestag 2013–2017
Members of the Bundestag 2009–2013
Members of the Bundestag 2005–2009
Members of the Bundestag for the Christian Social Union in Bavaria